"Que Me Quedes Tú" (English: "That You Stay With Me") is a song by Colombian singer-songwriter Shakira from her fifth studio album Laundry Service (2001). It was written by Shakira and composed by her and longtime friend Luis Fernando Ochoa. The song was released as the fifth single from Laundry Service and the lead single from her first Spanish greatest hits album Grandes Éxitos (2002) on 11 November 2002 by Epic Records.

"Que Me Quedes Tú" was a commercial success throughout the Spanish-speaking markets, peaking atop the Billboard Hot Latin Tracks chart.

Music video
The accompanying music video for "Que Me Quedes Tú" was directed by Argentinian directors Ramiro Agula and Esteban Sapir, who also directed the music video for "The One" and the DVD Live & off the Record.

Format and track listing
 Digital download
 "Que Me Quedes Tú" - 4:48

Charts

Weekly charts

Year-end charts

Certifications

Release history

References

2002 singles
Shakira songs
Songs written by Shakira
Spanish-language songs
Rock ballads
2000s ballads